The Kingdom of Serbia was a province (crownland) of the Habsburg monarchy from 1718 to 1739. It was formed from the territories to the south of the rivers Sava and Danube, corresponding to the Sanjak of Smederevo (or "Belgrade Pashalik"), conquered by the Habsburgs from the Ottoman Empire in 1717.  It was abolished and returned to the Ottoman Empire in 1739.

During this Habsburg rule, Serbian majority did benefit from self-government, including an autonomous militia, and economic integration with the Habsburg monarchy — reforms that contributed to the growth of the Serb middle class and continued by the Ottomans "in the interest of law and order". Serbia's population increased rapidly from 270,000 to 400,000, but the decline of Habsburg power in the region provoked the second Great Migrations of the Serbs (1737–1739).

History
 
In 1688–1689, during the Great Turkish War, the Habsburg troops temporarily took control over most of present-day Serbia, but were subsequently forced into retreat. The Treaty of Karlowitz in 1699 recognized Ottoman authority over most of present-day Serbia, while the region of Bačka and the western part of Syrmia were assigned to the Habsburgs.

Another war broke out in 1716–1718, in which Serbs massively joined the Habsburg troops. After the gains of 1718 (following the Treaty of Passarowitz), the Habsburgs sought to integrate Serbia into their empire. The land was officially named the "Kingdom of Serbia", because it was neither a part of the Holy Roman Empire nor the Kingdom of Hungary. The actual administration of the province was in the hands of an appointed governor. Not all the Serb-inhabited territory south of the Sava and Danube rivers that was conquered by the Habsburgs in 1718 was included in the Kingdom of Serbia. A large eastern area was administratively separate as part of the Banat of Temeswar.

After a new Austro-Turkish War (1737–39), the Habsburg monarchy lost all territories south of the Sava and Danube, including the whole territory of the Kingdom of Serbia, and Orșova north of the Danube. It retained, however, the rest of the Banat of Temeswar. The end of Habsburg rule resulted in the second Great Serb Migration (1737–1739).

Government

Serbia was jointly supervised by the Aulic War Council and the Court Chamber, and subordinated to a local military-cameral administration.

Governors
 Johann Joseph Anton O'Dwyer (1718–1720) (known as "General Odijer")
 Charles Alexander (1720–1733)
 Karl Christoph von Schmettau (1733–1738)
 George Oliver de Wallis (1738–1739)

Serbian Militia

Following the Treaty of Passarowitz (1718), the Habsburgs established the Kingdom of Serbia and appointed the first command cadre of the Serbian National Militia, composed out of two obor-kapetans, ten kapetans, two lieutenants and one major. The obor-kapetans were Vuk Isaković "Crnobarac" and Staniša Marković "Mlatišuma". During the Austro-Russian–Turkish War (1735–1739), the Serbian Militia was divided into 18 companies, in four groups (obor-kapetanije).

Demographics
A 1720 regulation declared that Belgrade was to be settled mainly by German Catholics, while the Serbs were to live outside the city walls in the "Rascian" part. It has been estimated that the population in Belgrade in the 1720s did not exceed 20,000. The population increased rapidly from 270,000 to 400,000, but the end of Habsburg power in the region resulted in the second Great Serb Migration (1737–1739).

Aftermath
 
Although the Habsburg administration over this part of present-day Serbia was short-lived, the consciousness about separate political entity was left behind by the Habsburgs, thus local inhabitants never again fully accepted Ottoman administration, which led to Koča's frontier rebellion in 1788 and to the First Serbian Uprising in 1804, which ended direct Ottoman rule over this part of present-day Serbia.

References

Sources
 
 
 
 
 
 
 
 
 
 
 
 
 
 

Kingdom of Serbia (1718–1739)
18th century in Serbia
States and territories established in 1718
States and territories disestablished in 1739
Former countries in the Balkans
1718 establishments in the Habsburg monarchy
1739 disestablishments in the Habsburg monarchy
Austro-Turkish War (1716–1718)
Serbia (1718–39)